Rhubarb is a 1951 film adapted from the 1946 novel Rhubarb by humorist H. Allen Smith. Directed by Arthur Lubin, the screwball noir comedy stars the cat Orangey along with Jan Sterling and Ray Milland. Cinematography was by Lionel Lindon. The supporting cast features William Frawley and Gene Lockhart.

Plot 
Thaddeus J. Banner (Gene Lockhart), a lonely, eccentric millionaire who owns a baseball team, the Brooklyn Loons, takes a liking to a dog-chasing stray cat (played by Orangey), and takes him into his home. He names the cat "Rhubarb," which is baseball slang for an on-field argument or fight.

When the man dies, it is discovered that his last will and testament made Rhubarb his sole beneficiary; hence the cat inherits the baseball team. Team publicist Eric Yeager (Ray Milland) is named the cat's guardian. His fiancée Polly Sickles (Jan Sterling), daughter of the team's manager (William Frawley), is terribly allergic to Rhubarb, causing many problems.

Banner's spoiled, greedy, and unhappy daughter Myra (Elsie Holmes) files a lawsuit, contesting the will. And when the team's players discover they are owned by a cat, they stage a protest until Yeager persuades them that Rhubarb brings them luck.

Brooklyn begins winning and will play the powerful New York team for the championship. But a bookie who stands to lose big if Brooklyn wins decides to kidnap the cat. Brooklyn's fortunes turn for the worse while the search for Rhubarb goes on, until the cat finally escapes from his captors and races to the ballpark to save the day.

Cast
 Orangey as Rhubarb
 Ray Milland as Eric Yeager
 Jan Sterling as Polly Sickles
 William Frawley as Len Sickles
 Gene Lockhart as T.J. Banner
 Elsie Holmes as Myra Banner
 Taylor Holmes as P. Duncan Munk
 Willard Waterman as Orlando Dill
 Henry Slate as Dud Logan
 James Griffith as Ogelthorpe 'Oggie' Meadows
 Jim Hayward as Doom
 Donald MacBride as Pheeny
 Hal K. Dawson as Mr. Fisher

Production
The film was based on a novel by H. Allen Smith which was published in 1946. Smith had written several books of humorous items but this was his first novel. The New York Times called it a "rough and raucous satire". The book became a best seller.

Roy Del Ruth was interested in the film rights but stepped aside when Mike Todd expressed interest. Todd bought the film rights for $100,000 but then had financial troubles and could not pay. Smith was approached by other producers - one wanted to change the cat to a dog, another wanted to change the baseball team to a football team so as to appeal to Britain. The project was optioned to another producer who did not pay the option fee and another producer wanted the cat to inherit a burlesque house. There was no interest in the project for two years, then film rights were bought by Arthur Lubin who had just made Francis the Talking Mule and was looking for another animal story.

In December 1949 it was reported Arthur Lubin had hired Frank Cockrell to write a script based on the novel, intending to film it after Francis In January 1950 Lubin had hired Dorothy Reid to work on the script and wanted Glenn Ford to star; Reid and Lubin had collaborated numerous times, most recently on Francis.

Lubin pitched the project to Universal, who made Francis but they passed. So too did several other studios. In August 1950 Lubin sold the project to Paramount. In September the film was assigned to a production unit at Paramount run by William Perlberg and George Seaton. The following month Ray Milland signed to star.

A nationwide talent search was held to discover a cat to play the title role. It went to Moody, who belonged to Agnes Murray of Sherman Oaks. Moody had twenty three different stand ins.

Filming took place in March 1951. Fourteen different cats portrayed Rhubarb at different points in the film. Each cat was trained to do a different trick. Three of the most similar looking cats appeared in the courtroom scene where Polly Sickles has to choose which one is the real Rhubarb.

Lubin recalled that on the first day of filming the cat who played Rhubarb "deliberately bit me in the leg. I was quick enough to retaliate with a quick kick that sent me spinning.  Fortunately the Humane Association representative was not looking. From then on the cat and I had a good actor-director relationship. He was cruel and nasty to everyone on set but he respected me and kept his distance."

The film prompted Smith to write a sequel.

Strother Martin and Leonard Nimoy have uncredited roles in this film.

William Frawley began portraying "Fred Mertz" in the I Love Lucy television series with Lucille Ball and Desi Arnaz initially broadcast two months after the release of Rhubarb that same year.

Reception
The film earned an estimated $1.45 million at the US box office in 1951.

The New York Times said the film had "a lot of good natured chuckles" but also "some arid stretches and the humor is seldom as sharp as it was in the book."

Diabolique magazine wrote "There are some funny moments though the director can’t overcome the main problem of all live action movies about cats – namely, their personality doesn’t come across screen. There’s no strong relationship between Rhubarb and Ray Milland so the film feels hollow at its core in a way the Francis movies never did."

In 1973 Lubin was working on a TV series based on the movie. It was never made.

Awards
Orangey won PATSY Awards (Picture Animal Top Star of the Year, the animal version of an Oscar) for his appearances in both Rhubarb and Breakfast at Tiffany's, the only cat so far to win more than once.

The film was released on DVD by Legend Films on July 1, 2008.

References

External links
 
 
 
 
 
 Rhubarb the Cat

1951 films
American baseball films
American sports comedy films
American black-and-white films
1950s English-language films
Films about cats
Films based on American novels
Films directed by Arthur Lubin
Paramount Pictures films
1950s sports comedy films
1951 comedy films
Films produced by William Perlberg
Films produced by George Seaton
1950s American films